ANAPROF 2005 is the 2005 season of the Panamanian football (soccer) league, ANAPROF.  The season started on February 11, 2005 with the "Torneo Apertura 2005" and finalized on November 12, 2005 with the Torneo Clausura 2005. The Apertura champion was Plaza Amador and the Clausura champion was San Francisco, on November 22, 2005 the ANAPROF 2005 final was played and Plaza Amador was crowned champion over San Francisco.

Change for 2005
Sporting Cocle were renamed Sporting '89 before the start of this season.
Colón River F.C. were excluded after 17 matches of the Apertura championship and further excluded from the Clausura championship.

Teams

Apertura 2005

Standings

Results table

Final round

Semifinals 1st Leg

Semifinals 2nd Leg

Final

Top goal scorer

Clausura 2005

Standings

Results table

Final round

Semifinals 1st leg

Semifinals 2nd leg

Final

 [*] The game finished After Extra Time.

Grand final

Final

Plaza Amador champions 2005 in spite of a negative season record with respect to wins-losses and goals scored-conceded.

Top goal scorer

Relegation table

Relegation playoff

Sporting '89 remain in ANAPROF

Local derby statistics

El Super Clasico Nacional - Tauro v Plaza Amador

Clasico del Pueblo - Plaza Amador v Chorillo

Derbi Interiorano - Atlético Chiriquí v Atlético Veragüense

References

RSSF ANAPROF 2005

ANAPROF seasons
1
Pan
1
Pan